Phủ Cam Cathedral is a Roman Catholic cathedral in Huế, Vietnam. It is one of the biggest churches in the city.

History
The cathedral was built on a hill where an orange plantation once stood. Construction started on the property in 1963 with further additions in 2000. Built in the style of Modern Architecture, it was designed by the architect Ngô Viết Thụ. Supporting concrete pillars were built close to the walls and gradually bent. Each of the four corners has three such pillars, creating a fairly large space inside the building.  The interior of the Cathedral was built following classical Roman Catholic tradition. There are two rows of coloured glass windows located in the upper interior of the Cathedral. Inside, there is a cross made of steel and concrete on a round pillar. The Cathedral has a marble altar located in a small round-shaped space. The building has two wings extending to the right and left; the tomb of the former archbishop Philippe Nguyên-Kim-Diên (1921-1988) is on the left and a shrine presenting a saint is on the right. In front of the building are two statues: Saint Phero is on the right and on the left is Saint Paulo and other missionaries of the Phu Cam diocese. The Ministry of Tourism describes the cathedral as such: “The open-space of Phu Cam main cathedral looks like an opening-mouth-dragon and in general Phu Cam cathedral with its top perpendicularly stretching to the sky is very purified and full of artistic and religious character".

Construction of the Cathedral took nearly 40 years. An older church was torn down and the construction of the new Cathedral started in 1960. During construction, a coup took place during which President Ngo Dinh Diem was killed. Archbishop Ngo Dinh Thuc was in Rome at the time and was unable to return to Vietnam due to the political situation. The construction was still taking place in 1968 when it was heavily damaged by bombing during the Tet Offensive. Construction was delayed and ultimately abandoned after 1975. Construction was completed in  May 2000, with the official consecration taking place during the Feast of Saints Peter and Paul on 28 and 29 June 2000. Saints Peter and Paul are the patrons of the Parish.

The Residential Delegation to Vietnam of the Head of the Vatican, the Pope, (which oversaw Vietnam, Thailand, Cambodia and Laos together) was built next to the former cathedral in Huế (that was demolished to make way for the current Phủ Cam Cathedral) on May 20, 1925. This office was then moved to Hanoi in 1951.

Over 400 people supportive of the South Vietnamese government were rounded up at the Cathedral in February 1968 by the Viet Cong, when they were led to the creek and shot dead.

A new pastoral house was opened at the cathedral on October 8, 2014 with Archbishop Francis Xavier Lê Văn Hồng hosting a ribbon-cutting and blessing ceremony for inauguration the pastoral house. It was built with money collected in the area and from benefactors abroad.

See also
Roman Catholicism in Vietnam

References

Roman Catholic cathedrals in Vietnam
20th-century Roman Catholic church buildings in Vietnam